The 1885 Pittsburgh Alleghenys season was the fourth season of the Pittsburgh Alleghenys franchise. The Alleghenys finished third in the American Association with a record of 56–55.

Offseason 
 October 30, 1884: Rudy Kemmler was purchased by the Alleghenys from the Columbus Buckeyes.

Regular season

Season standings

Record vs. opponents

Game log 

|- style="background:#cfc;"
| 1 || Saturday, Apr 18 || @ St. Louis Browns || 7–0 || 1–0
|- style="background:#fbb;"
| 2 || Sunday, Apr 19 || @ St. Louis Browns || 0–3 || 1–1
|- style="background:#cfc;"
| 3 || Tuesday, Apr 21 || @ Louisville Colonels || 4–3 || 2–1
|- style="background:#fbb;"
| 4 || Wednesday, Apr 22 || @ Louisville Colonels || 0–11 || 2–2
|- style="background:#cfc;"
| 5 || Friday, Apr 24 || @ Cincinnati Red Stockings || 7–6 || 3–2
|- style="background:#fbb;"
| 6 || Saturday, Apr 25 || @ Cincinnati Red Stockings || 2–8 || 3–3
|- style="background:#fbb;"
| 7 || Sunday, Apr 26 || @ St. Louis Browns || 0–2 || 3–4
|- style="background:#cfc;"
| 8 || Tuesday, Apr 28 || Louisville Colonels || 4–0 || 4–4
|- style="background:#fbb;"
| 9 || Wednesday, Apr 29 || Louisville Colonels || 3–4 || 4–5
|-

|- style="background:#cfc;"
| 10 || Saturday, May 2 || St. Louis Browns || 3–2 || 5–5
|- style="background:#fbb;"
| 11 || Sunday, May 3 || @ Cincinnati Red Stockings || 6–7 || 5–6
|- style="background:#fbb;"
| 12 || Monday, May 4 || @ Cincinnati Red Stockings || 0–3 || 5–7
|- style="background:#cfc;"
| 13 || Tuesday, May 5 || Cincinnati Red Stockings || 8–1 || 6–7
|- style="background:#fbb;"
| 14 || Thursday, May 7 || New York Metropolitans || 1–3 || 6–8
|- style="background:#cfc;"
| 15 || Friday, May 8 || New York Metropolitans || 13–3 || 7–8
|- style="background:#cfc;"
| 16 || Saturday, May 9 || New York Metropolitans || 16–3 || 8–8
|- style="background:#cfc;"
| 17 || Monday, May 11 || New York Metropolitans || 13–4 || 9–8
|- style="background:#cfc;"
| 18 || Tuesday, May 12 || Brooklyn Grays || 8–4 || 10–8
|- style="background:#fbb;"
| 19 || Wednesday, May 13 || Brooklyn Grays || 2–6 || 10–9
|- style="background:#cfc;"
| 20 || Thursday, May 14 || Brooklyn Grays || 5–2 || 11–9
|- style="background:#cfc;"
| 21 || Saturday, May 16 || Brooklyn Grays || 13–4 || 12–9
|- style="background:#fbb;"
| 22 || Monday, May 18 || Philadelphia Athletics || 0–7 || 12–10
|- style="background:#cfc;"
| 23 || Tuesday, May 19 || Philadelphia Athletics || 11–8 || 13–10
|- style="background:#cfc;"
| 24 || Wednesday, May 20 || Philadelphia Athletics || 9–8 || 14–10
|- style="background:#cfc;"
| 25 || Thursday, May 21 || Philadelphia Athletics || 8–3 || 15–10
|- style="background:#cfc;"
| 26 || Saturday, May 23 || Baltimore Orioles || 5–0 || 16–10
|- style="background:#cfc;"
| 27 || Monday, May 25 || Baltimore Orioles || 7–3 || 17–10
|- style="background:#cfc;"
| 28 || Tuesday, May 26 || Baltimore Orioles || 2–1 || 18–10
|- style="background:#cfc;"
| 29 || Wednesday, May 27 || Baltimore Orioles || 6–2 || 19–10
|- style="background:#fbb;"
| 30 || Saturday, May 30 || New York Metropolitans || 6–8 || 19–11
|- style="background:#fbb;"
| 31 || Saturday, May 30 || New York Metropolitans || 2–6 || 19–12
|-

|- style="background:#cfc;"
| 32 || Thursday, Jun 4 || @ Brooklyn Grays || 5–4 || 20–12
|- style="background:#cfc;"
| 33 || Friday, Jun 5 || @ Brooklyn Grays || 3–2 || 21–12
|- style="background:#fbb;"
| 34 || Saturday, Jun 6 || @ Brooklyn Grays || 2–13 || 21–13
|- style="background:#cfc;"
| 35 || Monday, Jun 8 || @ Brooklyn Grays || 2–0 || 22–13
|- style="background:#fbb;"
| 36 || Tuesday, Jun 9 || @ New York Metropolitans || 2–10 || 22–14
|- style="background:#fbb;"
| 37 || Wednesday, Jun 10 || @ Baltimore Orioles || 5–10 || 22–15
|- style="background:#cfc;"
| 38 || Thursday, Jun 11 || @ Baltimore Orioles || 12–8 || 23–15
|- style="background:#cfc;"
| 39 || Friday, Jun 12 || @ Baltimore Orioles || 3–2 || 24–15
|- style="background:#fbb;"
| 40 || Saturday, Jun 13 || @ Baltimore Orioles || 10–11 || 24–16
|- style="background:#fbb;"
| 41 || Tuesday, Jun 16 || @ Philadelphia Athletics || 1–14 || 24–17
|- style="background:#cfc;"
| 42 || Wednesday, Jun 17 || @ Philadelphia Athletics || 9–7 || 25–17
|- style="background:#fbb;"
| 43 || Thursday, Jun 18 || @ Philadelphia Athletics || 5–6 || 25–18
|- style="background:#fbb;"
| 44 || Saturday, Jun 20 || @ Philadelphia Athletics || 3–10 || 25–19
|- style="background:#fbb;"
| 45 || Monday, Jun 22 || St. Louis Browns || 2–6 || 25–20
|- style="background:#fbb;"
| 46 || Tuesday, Jun 23 || St. Louis Browns || 6–7 || 25–21
|- style="background:#fbb;"
| 47 || Wednesday, Jun 24 || St. Louis Browns || 6–7 || 25–22
|- style="background:#cfc;"
| 48 || Thursday, Jun 25 || St. Louis Browns || 6–1 || 26–22
|- style="background:#cfc;"
| 49 || Friday, Jun 26 || Louisville Colonels || 7–5 || 27–22
|- style="background:#cfc;"
| 50 || Saturday, Jun 27 || Louisville Colonels || 4–3 || 28–22
|- style="background:#fbb;"
| 51 || Monday, Jun 29 || Louisville Colonels || 3–4 || 28–23
|- style="background:#cfc;"
| 52 || Tuesday, Jun 30 || Cincinnati Red Stockings || 9–4 || 29–23
|-

|- style="background:#cfc;"
| 53 || Wednesday, Jul 1 || Cincinnati Red Stockings || 11–9 || 30–23
|- style="background:#cfc;"
| 54 || Thursday, Jul 2 || Cincinnati Red Stockings || 6–4 || 31–23
|- style="background:#fbb;"
| 55 || Saturday, Jul 4 || Philadelphia Athletics || 4–8 || 31–24
|- style="background:#fbb;"
| 56 || Saturday, Jul 4 || Philadelphia Athletics || 6–11 || 31–25
|- style="background:#fbb;"
| 57 || Monday, Jul 6 || Philadelphia Athletics || 0–8 || 31–26
|- style="background:#cfc;"
| 58 || Tuesday, Jul 7 || Philadelphia Athletics || 5–1 || 32–26
|- style="background:#cfc;"
| 59 || Thursday, Jul 9 || New York Metropolitans || 17–0 || 33–26
|- style="background:#fbb;"
| 60 || Friday, Jul 10 || New York Metropolitans || 5–7 || 33–27
|- style="background:#cfc;"
| 61 || Saturday, Jul 11 || New York Metropolitans || 2–0 || 34–27
|- style="background:#fbb;"
| 62 || Tuesday, Jul 14 || Baltimore Orioles || 2–5 || 34–28
|- style="background:#cfc;"
| 63 || Wednesday, Jul 15 || Baltimore Orioles || 5–0 || 35–28
|- style="background:#cfc;"
| 64 || Thursday, Jul 16 || Baltimore Orioles || 12–1 || 36–28
|- style="background:#cfc;"
| 65 || Saturday, Jul 18 || Baltimore Orioles || 6–1 || 37–28
|- style="background:#cfc;"
| 66 || Monday, Jul 20 || Brooklyn Grays || 4–3 || 38–28
|- style="background:#cfc;"
| 67 || Tuesday, Jul 21 || Brooklyn Grays || 7–5 || 39–28
|- style="background:#cfc;"
| 68 || Wednesday, Jul 22 || Brooklyn Grays || 5–3 || 40–28
|- style="background:#cfc;"
| 69 || Thursday, Jul 23 || Brooklyn Grays || 6–5 || 41–28
|- style="background:#cfc;"
| 70 || Saturday, Jul 25 || @ St. Louis Browns || 2–1 || 42–28
|- style="background:#fbb;"
| 71 || Sunday, Jul 26 || @ St. Louis Browns || 1–8 || 42–29
|- style="background:#cfc;"
| 72 || Friday, Jul 31 || @ Louisville Colonels || 8–2 || 43–29
|-

|- style="background:#fbb;"
| 73 || Saturday, Aug 1 || @ Louisville Colonels || 5–7 || 43–30
|- style="background:#fbb;"
| 74 || Sunday, Aug 2 || @ Louisville Colonels || 1–4 || 43–31
|- style="background:#fbb;"
| 75 || Tuesday, Aug 4 || @ Cincinnati Red Stockings || 1–4 || 43–32
|- style="background:#fbb;"
| 76 || Friday, Aug 7 || @ Cincinnati Red Stockings || 2–3 || 43–33
|- style="background:#fbb;"
| 77 || Saturday, Aug 8 || @ St. Louis Browns || 0–7 || 43–34
|- style="background:#cfc;"
| 78 || Sunday, Aug 9 || @ St. Louis Browns || 6–3 || 44–34
|- style="background:#fbb;"
| 79 || Tuesday, Aug 11 || @ St. Louis Browns || 1–3 || 44–35
|- style="background:#cfc;"
| 80 || Thursday, Aug 13 || @ Louisville Colonels || 2–1 || 45–35
|- style="background:#cfc;"
| 81 || Saturday, Aug 15 || @ Louisville Colonels || 7–2 || 46–35
|- style="background:#fbb;"
| 82 || Sunday, Aug 16 || @ Louisville Colonels || 10–11 || 46–36
|- style="background:#fbb;"
| 83 || Tuesday, Aug 18 || St. Louis Browns || 1–3 || 46–37
|- style="background:#fbb;"
| 84 || Wednesday, Aug 19 || St. Louis Browns || 4–6 || 46–38
|- style="background:#cfc;"
| 85 || Thursday, Aug 20 || St. Louis Browns || 11–10 || 47–38
|- style="background:#cfc;"
| 86 || Saturday, Aug 22 || Louisville Colonels || 3–2 || 48–38
|- style="background:#cfc;"
| 87 || Monday, Aug 24 || Louisville Colonels || 9–5 || 49–38
|- style="background:#cfc;"
| 88 || Wednesday, Aug 26 || Louisville Colonels || 7–5 || 50–38
|- style="background:#cfc;"
| 89 || Thursday, Aug 27 || @ Cincinnati Red Stockings || 8–2 || 51–38
|- style="background:#fbb;"
| 90 || Friday, Aug 28 || @ Cincinnati Red Stockings || 6–14 || 51–39
|- style="background:#fbb;"
| 91 || Sunday, Aug 30 || @ Cincinnati Red Stockings || 0–10 || 51–40
|-

|- style="background:#cfc;"
| 92 || Wednesday, Sep 2 || Cincinnati Red Stockings || 9–6 || 52–40
|- style="background:#fbb;"
| 93 || Thursday, Sep 3 || Cincinnati Red Stockings || 5–6 || 52–41
|- style="background:#fbb;"
| 94 || Saturday, Sep 5 || Cincinnati Red Stockings || 2–6 || 52–42
|- style="background:#cfc;"
| 95 || Tuesday, Sep 8 || @ New York Metropolitans || 4–2 || 53–42
|- style="background:#fbb;"
| 96 || Wednesday, Sep 9 || @ New York Metropolitans || 2–3 || 53–43
|- style="background:#fbb;"
| 97 || Friday, Sep 11 || @ Brooklyn Grays || 0–3 || 53–44
|- style="background:#fbb;"
| 98 || Saturday, Sep 12 || @ Brooklyn Grays || 1–4 || 53–45
|- style="background:#cfc;"
| 99 || Tuesday, Sep 15 || @ New York Metropolitans || 1–0 || 54–45
|- style="background:#fbb;"
| 100 || Wednesday, Sep 16 || @ New York Metropolitans || 1–5 || 54–46
|- style="background:#fbb;"
| 101 || Thursday, Sep 17 || @ Brooklyn Grays || 1–2 || 54–47
|- style="background:#fbb;"
| 102 || Friday, Sep 18 || @ New York Metropolitans || 8–9 || 54–48
|- style="background:#fbb;"
| 103 || Saturday, Sep 19 || @ Brooklyn Grays || 2–8 || 54–49
|- style="background:#cfc;"
| 104 || Wednesday, Sep 23 || @ Baltimore Orioles || 11–3 || 55–49
|- style="background:#fbb;"
| 105 || Thursday, Sep 24 || @ Baltimore Orioles || 2–4 || 55–50
|- style="background:#fbb;"
| 106 || Friday, Sep 25 || @ Baltimore Orioles || 5–10 || 55–51
|- style="background:#fbb;"
| 107 || Saturday, Sep 26 || @ Baltimore Orioles || 4–5 || 55–52
|- style="background:#fbb;"
| 108 || Monday, Sep 28 || @ Philadelphia Athletics || 4–6 || 55–53
|- style="background:#cfc;"
| 109 || Tuesday, Sep 29 || @ Philadelphia Athletics || 6–3 || 56–53
|- style="background:#fbb;"
| 110 || Wednesday, Sep 30 || @ Philadelphia Athletics || 2–5 || 56–54
|-

|- style="background:#fbb;"
| 111 || Thursday, Oct 1 || @ Philadelphia Athletics || 3–4 || 56–55
|-

|- style="text-align:center;"
| Legend:       = Win       = Loss

 Roster 

 Player stats 
BattersNote: G = Games played; AB = At bats; H = Hits; Avg. = Batting average; HR = Home runs; RBI = Runs batted inPitchersNote: G = Games pitched; IP = Innings pitched; W = Wins; L = Losses; ERA = Earned run average; SO = Strikeouts''

Notable transactions 
 June 25, 1885: Milt Scott was purchased by the Alleghenys from the Detroit Wolverines.

References 

Pittsburgh Pirates seasons
Pittsburgh Alleghenys season
Pittsburg Pir